Fouzieh Majd (also spelled Fozie Majd) is a Persian composer and ethnomusicologist. She was educated in England and France. In the 1970s she was the head of a group to gather Persian folk songs at NITV.

References
 About Majd

External links 
 Listen to samples of Fozie Majd's piano works
 Fozie Majd's works in celebration of International Women’s Day

Iranian classical composers
Year of birth missing (living people)
Living people
Ethnomusicologists
Women classical composers
20th-century classical composers
21st-century classical composers
Iranian music arrangers
20th-century women composers
21st-century women composers